Andrea Mazzantini (born 11 July 1968) is an Italian former professional football player who played as a goalkeeper.

Career

Mazzantini started his career with amateur club Canaletto under Adriano Buffon, the father of Italian goalkeeper Gianluigi Buffon.

After playing six seasons between Serie C2 and Serie C1, Mazzantini was appointed as a first choice goalkeeper by Venezia chairman, Maurizio Zamparini. 

After three seasons spent in Serie B, Mazzantini moved to Inter Milan where he used to be the backup choice of Italy international Gianluca Pagliuca. 

He played his first Serie A game in 1996-97, when replaced Pagliuca against Reggiana in the second half. Likewise, he played his second and last game with Inter in the final match of season 1997-98 against Empoli.

In January 1999 he moved to Perugia where he played three seasons and half under Serse Cosmi, prior to move to Siena at the beginning of season 2002-2003. However, he did not manage to make an appearance with them as he suffered a car accident and was forced to an early retirement.

Honours
Inter
 UEFA Cup: 1997–98

References

1968 births
Living people
Italian footballers
Association football goalkeepers
Serie A players
Serie B players
Aurora Pro Patria 1919 players
U.S. Livorno 1915 players
Spezia Calcio players
Venezia F.C. players
Inter Milan players
A.C. Perugia Calcio players
A.C.N. Siena 1904 players
UEFA Cup winning players